Professor Harminder Singh Dua  (Punjabi: ਹਰਮਿੰਦਰ ਸਿੰਘ ਦੁਆਹ, born in Jalandhar, Punjab, India) is an Indian-British medical doctor and researcher. He is the chair and professor of ophthalmology at University of Nottingham and is the head of the Division of Ophthalmology and Visual Sciences. Prior, he was associate professor at the Thomas Jefferson University, Philadelphia, USA when he was invited to chair in Nottingham in April 1994. He earlier did his Graduation in Medicine from Government Medical College and Hospital, Nagpur.

Dua is also the co-editor in chief with Arun Singh of the British Journal of Ophthalmology. He was president of EuCornea, the European society of Cornea and Ocular surface disease specialists. He is also president of the EVERf  (European Association for Vision and Eye Research Foundation) and past president of the association itself. He was elected to the chair of Academia Ophthalmologica Internationalis and invited to join as member of the American Ophthalmological Society by thesis. In March 2011 he  was elected president of the Royal College of Ophthalmologists, UK commencing  his duties on 25 May 2011. He has over 200 research publications, 20 published letters, and 14 book chapters to his credit.

Dua was appointed Commander of the Order of the British Empire (CBE) in the 2019 Birthday Honours for services to eye healthcare, health education and ophthalmology. In March 2021 he was appointed to the ceremonial post of Sheriff of Nottingham for 2021-22.

Discovery of Dua's layer

In a 2013 paper, Dua and others at the University of Nottingham reported discovery of a previously unknown layer of the human cornea measuring just 15 micrometres thick between the corneal stroma and Descemet's membrane. They refer to the reported layer as Dua's layer. However, this was considered very controversial in the field due to the convention within the medical community to stop using eponyms. In 2001,he proposed Dua classification for chemical injuries in eye.

See also 

 List of British Sikhs

References

External links
University of Nottingham - Professor Harminder Dua page
 LaserVision Nottingham - Professor Harminder Dua page 

Living people
People from Jalandhar
People from Punjab, India
British medical researchers
Academics of the University of Nottingham
Thomas Jefferson University faculty
Fellows of the Royal College of Ophthalmologists
Fellows of the Royal College of Surgeons
Year of birth missing (living people)
Commanders of the Order of the British Empire
Indian emigrants to England
Naturalised citizens of the United Kingdom